The 1967–68 Liga Femenina de Baloncesto was the 5th edition of the Spanish premier women's basketball championship. It took place from 12 November 1967 to 7 April 1968. Nine teams took part in the championship and CREFF Madrid won its fourth title. No teams were relegated due an expansion.

Regular season

References
Hispaligas

External links
Official website

Femenina
Liga Femenina de Baloncesto seasons
Spain
Spain